In enzymology, a cyanidin 3-O-rutinoside 5-O-glucosyltransferase is an enzyme that catalyzes the chemical reaction

UDP-glucose + cyanidin 3-O-rutinoside  UDP + cyanidin 3-O-rutinoside 5-O-beta-D-glucoside

Thus, the two substrates of this enzyme are UDP-glucose and cyanidin 3-O-rutinoside, whereas its two products are UDP and cyanidin 3-O-rutinoside 5-O-beta-D-glucoside.

This enzyme belongs to the family of glycosyltransferases, specifically the hexosyltransferases.  The systematic name of this enzyme class is UDP-glucose:cyanidin-3-O-beta-L-rhamnosyl-(1->6)-beta-D-glucoside 5-O-beta-D-glucosyltransferase. Other names in common use include uridine diphosphoglucose-cyanidin 3-rhamnosylglucoside, 5-O-glucosyltransferase, cyanidin-3-rhamnosylglucoside 5-O-glucosyltransferase, UDP-glucose:cyanidin-3-O-D-rhamnosyl-1,6-D-glucoside, and 5-O-D-glucosyltransferase.

See also
 Cyanidin

References

 

EC 2.4.1
Enzymes of unknown structure